Filić is a village located in the Novi Kneževac municipality, in the North Banat District of Serbia. It is situated in the Autonomous Province of Vojvodina. The village has a Serb ethnic majority (60.24%) with a significant Hungarian minority (38.50%). It has a population of 161 people (2002 census).

Name
In Serbian the settlement is known as Filić (Филић) and in Hungarian as Firigyháza. Former name for the village used in Serbian was Firiđhaza (Фириђхаза) or Firiđhaz (Фириђхаз), and in some Serbian sources name of the village is also written as Firić (Фирић). Filić is also an Serbo-Croatian name for the Italian town of San Felice del Molise.

Historical population

1981: 192
1991: 170
2002: 161

See also
List of places in Serbia
List of cities, towns and villages in Vojvodina

References
Slobodan Ćurčić, Broj stanovnika Vojvodine, Novi Sad, 1996.

External links
Municipalities of Vojvodina

Populated places in Serbian Banat
Populated places in North Banat District
Novi Kneževac